Xenothictis semiota is a species of moth of the  family Tortricidae. It is found on the Loyalty Islands in the south-west Pacific Ocean.

References

	

Moths described in 1910
Archipini